The 1941 New York Giants season was the franchise's 59th season. The team finished in fifth place in the National League with a 74–79 record, 25½ games behind the Brooklyn Dodgers.

Offseason 
 December 4, 1940: Glen Stewart was purchased from the Giants by the Brooklyn Dodgers.
 Prior to 1941 season: Marv Grissom was signed as an amateur free agent by the Giants.

Regular season

Season standings

Record vs. opponents

Opening Day lineup

Roster

Player stats

Batting

Starters by position 
Note: Pos = Position; G = Games played; AB = At bats; H = Hits; Avg. = Batting average; HR = Home runs; RBI = Runs batted in

Other batters 
Note: G = Games played; AB = At bats; H = Hits; Avg. = Batting average; HR = Home runs; RBI = Runs batted in

Pitching

Starting pitchers 
Note: G = Games pitched; IP = Innings pitched; W = Wins; L = Losses; ERA = Earned run average; SO = Strikeouts

Other pitchers 
Note: G = Games pitched; IP = Innings pitched; W = Wins; L = Losses; ERA = Earned run average; SO = Strikeouts

Relief pitchers 
Note: G = Games pitched; W = Wins; L = Losses; SV = Saves; ERA = Earned run average; SO = Strikeouts

Farm system 

LEAGUE CHAMPIONS: SalisburySan Bernardino franchise folded, June 29, 1941

References

External links
 1941 New York Giants team page at Baseball Reference
 1941 New York Giants team page at Baseball Almanac

New York Giants (NL)
San Francisco Giants seasons
New York Giants season
New York
1940s in Manhattan
Washington Heights, Manhattan